The 2022–23 Women's LEN Euro Cup is the 24rd edition of the European second-tier tournament for women's water polo clubs. Sixteen teams participate in the competition. Ethnikos Piraeus is the defending champion.

Last 16 
References:

The sixteen teams are split into four groups of four teams with the top two teams from each group qualifying for the quarterfinals.

Group A (Piraeus, Greece)

Group B (Mulhouse, France)

Group C (Lille, France)

Group D (Porto, Portugal)

Quarterfinals 
Sources:

|}

1st Leg 
  UVSE 10–10 Ethnikos 
  NC Vouliagmeni 15–12 Eger 
  Plebiscito Padova 12–10 Lille 
  CN Terrassa 9–7 Ferencvaros

2nd Leg 
  Ethnikos 9–13 UVSE 
  Eger 19–15 NC Vouliagmeni 
  Lille 5–11 Plebiscito Padova 
  Ferencvaros 14–9 CN Terrassa

Semifinals 
Sources:

|}

1st Leg 
  Plebiscito Padova 9–12 Ferencvaros 
  Eger 12–12 UVSE

2nd Leg 
  Ferencvaros 7–9 Plebiscito Padova 
  UVSE 10–6 Eger

See also 
 2022–23 LEN Champions League Women

References 

Women's LEN Trophy seasons
2023 in water polo
LEN